Sophus Halle  (13 December 1862 – 1924) was a Danish composer.

See also
List of Danish composers

References
This article was initially translated from the Danish Wikipedia.

Danish composers
Male composers
1862 births
1924 deaths